is a manufacturing company based in Tokyo.

Founding and history 
The company name "Sugatsune" is a shortened form of the founder's name, Sugasawara Tsunesaburo.  It was founded as Sugatsune Shouten in Kanda, Tokyo in 1930. The store was incorporated and changed its name to Sugatsune Kogyo Co, Ltd., and started manufacturing telecommunication hardware components until the end of World War II. Thereafter, the company started producing architectural and furniture hardware. Sugatsune first hardware was exported to the U.S. in 1949.

Sugatsune is a source for hardware products and component hardware for homes, telecommunication devices, consumer electronics, and marine equipment. Several Sugatsune products have won the Good Design Award in Japan, administered by the Ministry of International Trade and Industry.

Sugatsune is headquartered in Iwamotochō, Tokyo and the company has sales and distribution offices in the United States, Canada, the United Kingdom, Germany, China, India, and South Korea.

Products

Sugatsune's product range includes over 20,000 items. The items range from architectural furniture and hardware to industrial components. This includes hinges, hooks, catches, drawer slides, brackets, handles and more. It produces products for a variety of industries as diverse as cabinets, semiconductor fabrication plants, yachts, doors, and more.

Sugatsune's hinges are used around the world and are recognized in the industry.

MonoFlat Unison (MFU) is a sliding door system that enables doors to move inward and slide sideways without use of door handles in order to close flush with the wall. The external surface of the door can be flush with the wall or surrounding enclosure, giving a monolithic appearance.

Multimo is a multiple-motion door system for cabinets, allowing them be pulled out and slide sideways to allow more work space in front of the cabinet when the door is open. A damper provides smooth closing.

Brands
Lapcon (Lamp Control) is a damper mechanism for smooth door opening and closing of drawers and doors. Several products featuring the mechanism won Japan's Good Design Award. Lapcon mechanisms can be found in many different products, including cabinetry doors and toilet seats. Both Monoflat FAD (FAD) and LIN-X use Lapcon Mechanisms and are lateral door opening mechanism. FAD enables flaps and doors to open sideways (laterally) without the use of a bottom rail. Doors equipped with FAD have a smaller opening radius compared to ordinary swing doors.

Motion Design Tech, a line of products which focuses on the design of movement has achieved recognition in Japan and has been presented at trade shows around the world.

Locations 
Sugatsune has a total of seven branches in Japan and two distribution facilities in Chiba and Osaka. In addition, there are nine other sales offices in seven countries overseas (USA, Canada, UK, Germany, China, India, and South Korea).

Sales Offices in Japan 

 Headquarters - 2-9-13 Iwamoto-cho, Chiyoda-ku, Tokyo
 Tokyo Head Office Sales Architectural Division - 2-5-10 Iwamotocho, Chiyoda-ku, Tokyo
 Tokyo Head Office Sales Department Industrial Division - 2-17-9 Iwamotocho, Chiyoda-ku, Tokyo
 Osaka Branch - 2-2-6 Uchiawaji-cho, Chuo-ku, Osaka-shi, Osaka
 Sendai Sales Office - HF Sendai Honmachi Building 8F, 1-11-1 Honmachi, Aoba-ku, Sendai City, Miyagi Prefecture
 North Kanto Sales Office - 2F EST900 Building, 51-1 Kaminakai-cho, Takasaki, Gunma
 Kanagawa Sales Office - 6F Wellstone 1, 87-1 Kawakami-cho, Totsuka-ku, Yokohama, Kanagawa
 Nagoya Sales Office - 3-15-3, Ohsone, Kita-ku, Nagoya-shi, Aichi
 Kyoto Sales Office - 399-27 Kujo-cho, Minami-ku, Kyoto-shi, Kyoto
 Fukuoka Sales Office - 1-13-8, Hakataeki-Minami, Hakata-ku, Fukuoka-shi, Fukuoka
 Chiba Plant/Motion Design Tech Lab - 679 Bakke Hongo, Matsuo-cho, Yamato-shi, Chiba

Distribution Facilities in Japan 

 Logistics Centre (SBC) - 208-72 Fujimidai, Matsuo-cho, Yamato-shi, Chiba
 Logistics WEST (SBW) - 4-11-10, Gun, Ibaraki, Osaka

Overseas Sales Offices, Showrooms and Distribution Centres 
Sugatsune America, Inc.

 Los Angeles Main Office - 18101 Savarona Way, Carson, CA 90746 USA
 Midwest Distribution Center - 1790 W Cortland Court, Addison, IL 60101 USA

Sugatsune Canada, Inc.

 Montreal Office - 3775 Boulevard du Tricentenaire Montreal, Quebec H1B-5W3

Sugatsune Kogyo (UK) Limited

 Reading Office - Unit 635 Wharfedale Road Winnersh Triangle Wokingham RG41 5TP UK

Sugatsune Europe GmbH

 Düsseldorf Office & Showroom - Heerdter Lohweg 87-89 D-40549 Düsseldorf Germany

Sugatsune Shanghai Co., Ltd.

 Shanghai Showroom - Building No.3, No.100 Hu lan West Road, Baoshan District, Shanghai 200443, China
 Guangzhou Office - Room206, No.11-13 Jie Jin Zhong Road, Fu Du Building, Shiqiao Town, Panyu District, Guangzhou 511405, China

Sugatsune Kogyo India Private Limited

 Mumbai Office & Showroom - No. G-002 & B-02, Ground Floor, KANAKIA ATRIUM – 2 Next to Courtyard Marriott Hotel, Andheri Kurla Road, Andheri East, Mumbai-400093, Maharashtra, INDIA

Sugatsune Korea Co., Ltd.

 Incheon Office - 407 Tower2, 495 Parang-ro, Seo-gu, Incheon, KOREA 22770

References

External links
Sugatsune America
Sugatsune Kogyo UK Ltd
Sugatsune India
Sugatsune International
Sugatsune Shanghai - Mandarin 
Sugatsune Japan - Japanese 

Manufacturing companies based in Tokyo
Hardware merchants
Manufacturing companies established in 1930
Japanese companies established in 1930